Arindam Bhattacharya may refer to:

 Arindam Bhattacharya (politician) (born 1980), Indian politician
 Arindam Bhattacharya (footballer) (born 1989), Indian footballer